Salin Mibaya (also known as Narapati Medaw, (နရပတိ မယ်တော်)) was the chief queen of Viceroy Thado Dhamma Yaza II of Prome (r. 1551–1588).

The second daughter of King Bayin Htwe of Prome and his chief queen Shwe Zin Gon was married three times. Her marriage to her first cousin Min Ba Saw—a son of her maternal uncle—was cut short when her brother King Narapati had him executed. Narapati then married her off to Sithu Kyawhtin, then governor of Salin, a powerful figure in the Confederation of Shan States, in a marriage of state in the late 1530s. (Prome was then a de facto vassal state of the Confederation, which controlled all of Ava territories except Toungoo in Upper Burma.) Her stay at Salin lasted until January 1544 when the city was captured by Toungoo forces under Gen. Bayinnaung. Her husband escaped to Ava (Inwa) but she was captured and sent to Pegu (Bago). In 1545, she was married to Nanda Yawda, a younger brother of Bayinnaung, at the coronation ceremony of Tabinshwehti at the Pegu Palace.

She returned to her native Prome as queen in 1551 when her husband was appointed viceroy of the region by King Bayinnaung. She had two daughters by Nanda Yawda, now styled as Thado Dhamma Yaza II. Their elder daughter Hsinbyushin Medaw became the chief queen of Nawrahta Minsaw, the viceroy (and later king) of Lan Na. The younger daughter Min Taya Medaw was a major queen of Nanda.

Ancestry
The following is her ancestry as reported in the Hmannan Yazawin chronicle, which in turn referenced contemporary inscriptions. Her parents were double cousins.

Notes

References

Bibliography
 
 

Ava dynasty
Prome dynasty
Chief queens consort of Toungoo dynasty
16th-century Burmese women